Tiffany Thomas Kane,  (born 9 August 2001) is a retired Australian Paralympic swimmer. She represented Australia at the 2016 Rio Paralympics, winning a gold and three bronze medals, and at the 2020 Tokyo Paralympics, winning a further two bronze medals.

Personal
Thomas Kane was born on 9 August 2001 with hypochondroplasia, a developmental disorder causing short stature. She attended Ravenswood School for Girls in Sydney, New South Wales.

Career
Thomas Kane took up swimming at the age of 3. She is an S6 swimmer. In 2015, she trains under Lach Falvey at Ravenswood Swim Club, the same club as dual world champion and Olympic silver medallist James Magnussen. 
She was the youngest Australian swimmer selected to compete at the 2015 IPC Swimming World Championships in Glasgow, Scotland after breaking world records at the 2015 Australian Swimming Championships.
At the age of 13, at 2015 IPC Swimming Championships, she won a gold medal in the Women's 100m breaststroke SB6 in a world record time of 1:34.95, silver medal in the Women's 50 m Butterfly S6 and bronze medals in the Women's 50 m Freestyle S6 and Women's 100 m Freestyle S6. 
 She finished fifth in the Women's 100m Backstroke S6 and seventh in the Mixed 4x50m Freestyle Relay 20pts. She was awarded Swimming Australia's 2015 AIS Discovery of the Year Award. In 2015, she is a New South Wales Institute of Sport scholarship holder.

At the 2016 Australian Swimming Championships in Adelaide, Thomas Kane set a world record of 43.06in Women's S6 in winning the Women's 50 breast multi-class event.

At the 2016 Rio Paralympics, Thomas Kane won the gold medal in the Women's 100 m Breaststroke SB6 with Paralympic record time of 1:35.39. She also won bronze medals in the Women's 50 m Freestyle, 50 m Butterfly S6 and 200 m Individual Medley SM6.

In reflection on racing at Rio, Thomas Kane says "It's taken everything away. Just to think that I'm here competing for my country, I've just not stopped trying every time. It's just been such a good time and I've enjoyed it every second." She continues to say "I wanted that gold medal in my race; I knew I had to go my best and it’s just such an amazing thing to have around me." Tiffany was officially awarded an Order of Australia medal in January 2017 for her "service to sport" following her accomplishments in Rio de Janeiro the previous year.

At the 2018 Commonwealth Games, Gold Coast, Thomas Kane finished fourth in two events – Women's S8 50m Freestyle and Women's S7 50m Butterfly.

At the 2019 World Para Swimming Championships in London, Thomas Kane won the gold medal in the Women's 100 m Breaststroke SB7 and placed fifth in four other events.

At the 2020 Tokyo Paralympics, Thomas Kane won bronze medals in the Women's 100 m Breaststroke SB7 (with a time of 1:35.02) and the Women's 200 m Individual Medley SM7 (with a time of 3:03.02). She also swam in the 50 m butterfly S7 but failed to advance to the final.

Her retirement was announced through twitter in April 2022.

Recognition
2015 – Discovery of the Year Award from Swimming Australia 
2017 – Medal of the Order of Australia (OAM)
2019 – Swimming Australia Paralympic Program Swimmer of the Year (joint winner with Lakeisha Patterson)

References

External links
 
 
 

Female Paralympic swimmers of Australia
Swimmers with dwarfism
Sportswomen from New South Wales
Swimmers at the 2016 Summer Paralympics
Swimmers at the 2020 Summer Paralympics
Place of birth missing (living people)
Medalists at the 2016 Summer Paralympics
Paralympic gold medalists for Australia
Paralympic bronze medalists for Australia
S6-classified Paralympic swimmers
Recipients of the Medal of the Order of Australia
2001 births
Living people
Medalists at the World Para Swimming Championships
Paralympic medalists in swimming
Australian female medley swimmers
Australian female breaststroke swimmers
21st-century Australian women